Gary A. Braunbeck (born 1 July 1960) is an American science fiction, fantasy, mystery and horror author.

Biography
Braunbeck was born in Newark, Ohio (the city that serves as the model for the fictitious Cedar Hill in many of his stories). He writes in a number of different genres, but principally horror. His work has received several awards, including the Horror Writers Association Bram Stoker Award for Superior Achievement in Best Short Fiction in 2003 and 2005 for "Duty" and "We Now Pause for Station Identification", respectively. In 2007, he won two Bram Stoker Awards, for Long Fiction with "Afterward, There Will Be a Hallway", and for Anthology with Five Strokes to Midnight (edited with Hank Schwaeble). He also won their 2006 award for Best Fiction Collection with his anthology Destinations Unknown, published by Cemetery Dance Publications, and their 2010 award for nonfiction with To Each Their Darkness, published by Apex Publications. He won the 2013 Bram Stoker Award for Long Fiction with "The Great Pity." His novella "Kiss of the Mudman" received the International Horror Guild Award for Long Fiction in 2006.

Nearly 200 of his short stories have appeared in various publications such as The Magazine of Fantasy & Science Fiction, Cemetery Dance, Sword of Ice and Other Tales of Valdemar, and The Year's Best Fantasy and Horror. Some of his most popular stories are mysteries that have appeared in the Cat Crimes anthology series. In 2007 his story "Rami Temporales" was adapted by Stranger Things into a short film entitled "One of Those Faces" starring Toby Turner.

Braunbeck also taught creative writing at Seton Hill University, Pennsylvania, in theirlow-residency Master of Fine Arts degree program in Writing Popular Fiction.

He has also served as co-editor for the fifth installment of the Masques horror-anthology series created by Jerry Williamson, Masques V. For a time he was also a regular contributor to Everything2 and served briefly as a content editor there.

In 2005-2006, Braunbeck served a term as President of the Horror Writers Association. He is married to Lucy A. Snyder, a science fiction/fantasy writer, and they reside together in Columbus, Ohio. He dubbed the Dreadtime Stories series April Fool.

Awards

Bibliography

Novels
 (1998) Time Was: Isaac Asimov's I-Bots (co-written with Steve Perry)
 (2000) The Indifference of Heaven
 (2000) Dark Matter #1: In Hollow Houses
 (2001) This Flesh Unknown
 (2004) Cedar Hill #1: In Silent Graves
 (2005) We Now Pause for Station Identification
 (2005) In the Midnight Museum
 (2005) Cedar Hill #2: Keepers
 (2006) Prodigal Blues
 (2007) Cedar Hill #3: Mr. Hands
 (2008) Cedar Hill #4: Coffin County
 (2009) Cedar Hill #5: Far Dark Fields

Collections
 Things Left Behind (1997) 
Escaping Purgatory (2001) 
Sorties, Cathexes, and Personal Effects (2002) 
Graveyard People: The Collected Cedar Hill Stories, Volume 1 (2003) 
X3 (contains three science fiction novellas: "One Brown Mouse", "At Eternity's Gate", and "Palimpsest Day"; 2003)
A Little Orange Book of Odd Stories (2003)
From Beneath these Fields of Blood (2004)
Home Before Dark: The Collected Cedar Hill Stories, Volume 2 (2005)
Destinations Unknown (2006)
Smiling Faces Sometimes (2007)
Cages and Those Who Hold the Keys (2011)
Rose of Sharon (2013)
Halfway Down the Stairs (2015)
There Comes a Midnight Hour (2021)

Nonfiction books
 (2004) Fear In A Handful Of Dust: Horror As A Way Of Life
 (2010) To Each Their Darkness

Books edited
 (2006) Masques V (co-edited with Jerry Williamson)
 (2007) Five Strokes to Midnight (co-edited with Hank Schwaeble)

References

External links

1960 births
20th-century American novelists
20th-century American male writers
21st-century American novelists
American horror writers
American male novelists
American science fiction writers
Living people
Writers from Columbus, Ohio
People from Newark, Ohio
Seton Hill University
American male short story writers
20th-century American short story writers
21st-century American short story writers
21st-century American male writers
Novelists from Ohio